Sportpark Het Loopveld is a cricket ground in Amstelveen, the Netherlands.  The first and to date only recorded match on the ground came in 2003, when the ground held a Women's One Day International between Ireland Women and the West Indies Women in the IWCC Trophy.

The ground is used by ACC.

References

External links
Sportpark Het Loopveld at ESPNcricinfo
Sportpark Het Loopveld at CricketArchive

Cricket grounds in the Netherlands
Sports venues in Amstelveen